Li Mao (born 2 November 1992) is a Taiwanese footballer who currently plays as a striker for Taichung Futuro F.C. in the Taiwan Football Premier League and for the Chinese Taipei national football team.

Li gained attention by being top scorer with four goals in three matches at the 2017 CTFA International Tournament, with two goals against the Philippines and two goals against Laos, described by Taipei Times as "the key player for Taiwan."

International career

International goals
Scores and results list Chinese Taipei's goal tally first.

References

1992 births
Living people
Taiwanese footballers
Chinese Taipei international footballers
People from Hualien County
Taiwan Football Premier League players
Taichung Futuro F.C. players
Association football forwards